Lysimachia terrestris (swamp candles, lake loosestrife or earth loosestrife) is a plant in the family Primulaceae.

Description
Lysimachia terrestris is a herbaceous plant with opposite, simple leaves, and erect stems. The flowers are star-shaped with five yellow petals, and appear in mid-summer. Each petal has two red dots at its base forming a circle of ten red dots in the center of the flower.
Late in the summer, reddish bulblets form in the leaf axils. They resemble caterpillars and may be mistaken for fruit.

Ecology and distribution
Lysimachia terrestris grows in swamps and at the edges of ponds and lakes in the Eastern United States and in Eastern Canada.  It is also found in the U.S. states of Oregon, Washington, and Idaho, and in British Columbia. It is listed as endangered in Tennessee and Kentucky.

A major pest is Monostegia abdominalis, a sawfly larva that can completely skeletonize the leaves.

References

External links
 
 Lady Bird Johnson Wildflower Center−NPIN: Lysimachia terrestris
 
 
 

terrestris
Flora of Eastern Canada
Flora of the Eastern United States
Flora of the Northwestern United States
Flora of British Columbia
Flora of the Great Lakes region (North America)
Plants described in 1753
Taxa named by Carl Linnaeus
Flora without expected TNC conservation status